Casper "Cap" Boso (born September 10, 1963) is a former professional American football tight end who played six seasons in the National Football League (NFL) for the St. Louis Cardinals and Chicago Bears.

Boso attended the same high school, Saint Matthew Catholic School in Indianapolis IN (K-8), as Nick Martin of the Houston Texans, Zack Martin of the Dallas Cowboys, and Ted Karras of the Miami Dolphins. He played college football at the University of Illinois. Drafted by the Pittsburgh Steelers in the 8th round of the 1986 NFL Draft, Boso was cut early and subsequently signed by the St. Louis Cardinals, for whom he played 2 games in 1986. In 1987, the Cardinals waived him and the Chicago Bears signed him. Boso played for the Bears until 1991, after he experienced a series of knee injuries. Boso later filed suit and won the right to receive $353 a week in disability pay for the rest of his life.

References

1963 births
Living people
American football tight ends
Chicago Bears players
Illinois Fighting Illini football players
Players of American football from Kansas City, Missouri
St. Louis Cardinals (football) players